The Pepsi Venezuela Music Awards (PPM) are honors for the best music in Venezuela in various genres.

Its first edition took place on 29 March 2012 in Caracas and was broadcast on Venevisión. Since its second edition in 2013, it has been broadcast by Televen.

History
The Pepsi Music Awards were created to recognize Venezuela's musical talent in all its genres, connecting musicians among themselves, with their fans, and with the general public.

Each year, the process begins in October through nominations on the  website. After that, nominations close and voting begins with a jury chosen by the Pepsi Music Academy. This culminates with ceremonies that take place in September of the following year.

The awards have more than 60 categories in which bands or artists who have worked actively from 1 January to 15 December can be nominated.

Each winning artist in a category receives a personalized statuette with their name and the name of the category. The awards are delivered through two galas – one private (not televised) and another broadcast nationwide.

Pepsi Music Academy
The awards' governing body is the Pepsi Music Academy, comprising connoisseurs of Venezuela's music industry, independent of Pepsi-Cola Venezuela. It is responsible for the dissemination and design of the categories and regulations of each edition of the awards, ensuring compliance for the selection of the five nominees for each category, and later of the winners.

It is made up of two types of members differentiated by their participation in the awards' phases: Advisory Members – personalities with extensive experience and commitment to the country's music industry – and Specialist Members – knowledgeable opinion leaders of the music industry with specific strengths in one or more musical genres.

General categories

Specific categories

Editions

Summary

2012
The first edition of the awards took place on 28 March 2012 at the Quinta Esmeralda in Caracas and was broadcast by Venevisión. The main winners of the night were Chino & Nacho. The main theme was "No A La Violencia".

This was the only edition to be shown by Venevisión, due to the network's censorship of a large part of the awards, drawing criticism from the artists present.

The following winners were presented awards on the televised broadcast:

2013
The second edition of the awards ceremony took place on 28 May 2013. It was held at the Eurobuilding Hotel in Caracas, transmitted by Televen on 29 May, and presented by Erika de la Vega and Ramón Castro.

The event had been scheduled for 12 March, with the broadcast the following day, but it had to be postponed after the death of President Hugo Chávez. Also, this year the sponsor began to produce Pepsi Streams, hour-long programs hosted by Alex Goncalves that were part of the national talent support platform, with presentations and interviews with the nominees.

The following winners were presented awards on the televised broadcast:

2014
The third edition was held on 24 September 2014 at the Eurobuilding Hotel in Caracas. The gala was hosted by Ramón Castro. The "Blue Carpet" was streamed by E!, and the gala by Televen the next day.

Voting was opened on 27 July, and closed on 24 August. The event included a tribute to Simón Díaz.

The following winners were presented awards on the televised broadcast:

2015
The fourth edition was carried out with the non-televised ceremony on 7 September 2015, while the "Blue Carpet" and televised gala were held on 9 September at the Eurobuilding Hotel in Caracas. The gala was hosted by Ramón Castro and Daniela Kosán, and broadcast by Televen two days later, on 11 September.

This year four new awards were included: Classical, World, Llanera, and Film Theme. Voting began on 15 July and ended on 24 August.

The following winners were presented awards on the televised broadcast:

2017
The televised gala was hosted by Daniela Kosán and Ramón Castro. The "Blue Carpet" and the final gala were broadcast a day later by Televen.

Voting was opened on 5 October 2016, and closed on 16 November. The non-televised gala was held on 15 February 2017 at the Polar Business Center Auditorium and hosted by La Vero Gómez and Manuel Silva.

This edition had originally been planned for late 2016, but was postponed until February 2017, and all works published in 2015 were eligible. "The fifth edition was about to fail, but a great effort was made," said the president of the Pepsi Music Academy, John Fabio Bermúdez. It was planned that in September, when it would be customary to present the statuettes, works from 2016 would be awarded.

The following winners were presented awards on the televised broadcast:

2018
For the sixth edition of the gala, fans will be able to choose their favorite artists in more than 60 categories divided into 20 musical genres. Voting began on 17 July 2018.

This edition introduced the genre of trap, due to the strength with which the musical movement has been developing in recent years. Likewise, the most outstanding influencers will be awarded in the Digital Artist category. John Fabio Bermúdez, president of the Pepsi Music Academy, highlighted the importance of these awards for the country's music industry. "There are more than 400 artists recognized with these awards, which undoubtedly have been taken into account by them as a great support."

The following winners were presented awards on the televised broadcast:

References

External links
 

2012 establishments in Venezuela
Awards established in 2012
Events in Caracas
South American music awards
Venezuelan awards